Stinking Quarter Creek is a stream in the U.S. state of North Carolina. It is a tributary of Big Alamance Creek.

According to tradition, the name "Stinking Quarter" arose from the putrid stench of carrion after a buffalo hunt.

See also
List of rivers of North Carolina

References

Rivers of Alamance County, North Carolina
Rivers of North Carolina